The 2022 Moscow Victory Day Parade was held in Moscow's Red Square on 9 May 2022.

Events

Background
The parade was organised to commemorate the 77th anniversary of both the capitulation of Nazi Germany in the Second World War in 1945 and the historic Moscow Victory Parade of 1945.

Parade and situation 
The parade took place amid the backdrop of 2022 Russian invasion of Ukraine. The parade was not broadcast on some platforms outside of Russia due to social media boycotts and sanctions in response to the invasion. 

Within Russia, anti-war slogans appeared on  Russian satellite television as well as on Lenta.ru, a pro-government news website, on Victory Day.

According to the Russian state-owned TASS news agency, a number of foreign envoys from the Middle East and Africa attended the ceremony. Rodion Miroshnik, the ambassador to Russia from the Luhansk People's Republic (a pro-Russian breakaway region of Ukraine's Donbas region), addressed the crowd in Red Square.

Speculations
There were some speculations that Vladimir Putin would use the occasion to make a formal declaration of war on Ukraine. However this did not occur throughout the day.

Putin's speech 

The Russian president Vladimir Putin gave a speech at the parade. The speech did not give any specifics regarding the 2022 Russian invasion of Ukraine, and also did not refer to Ukraine by name in his speech. Putin condemned the Ukrainian government, the West and NATO, blaming their alleged aggressive actions for Russia's invasion and saying that NATO and the West was using Ukraine as a proxy to attack Russia. He also drew parallels between the current Ukrainian government and that of Nazi Germany, praising Russia's military, saying that present troops were "fighting for the motherland, for her future, and so that nobody forgets the lessons of World War II".

Preparatory Activities

Full order of the 2022 parade 
Bold indicates first appearance, italic indicates multiple appearances, Bold and italic indicate returning appearance, all indicated unless otherwise noted.

 General of the Army Sergey Shoigu, Minister of Defense of the Russian Federation (parade reviewing inspector)
General of the Army Oleg Salyukov, Commander-in-Chief of the Russian Ground Forces (parade commander)

Military bands

Infantry column

Mobile column 
 T-34/85 medium tank
 GAZ-233114 "Tigr-M" infantry mobility vehicle
 BMP Kurganets-25 IFV
 BMP-2 infantry fighting vehicle 
 BMP-3 infantry fighting vehicle 
 T-72B3M (T-72B4) modernized main battle tank
 T-14 main battle tank
 Buk-M3 mobile tracked SAM system
 Tor-M2  SAM complex on tracked chassis 
 S-400 Triumf SAM launch system on 5P85SM2-01 transporter-erector launcher
 9K720 Iskander-M mobile tactical ballistic missile system
 RS-24 Yars ICBM on 15U175M wheeled transporter-erector launcher 
 Kamaz 53949 Typhoon-K light MRAP
 Tornado-G Multiple Rocket Launcher Vehicle
 Uran-9 tracked unmanned ground combat vehicle (UCGV)

Air fly-past column 
The air fly-past column was ostensibly cut from the 2022 Victory Day Parade due to weather, despite the ground portion of the parade taking place with good visibility and somewhat cloudy skies.

See also 

 Moscow Victory Parade of 1945
 Victory Day (9 May)
 Victory in Europe Day
 Victory Day Parades

External links
The official website (May Parade)
The official website (June Parade)
LIVE: Victory parade takes place on Moscow's Red Square (ENGLISH)

References 

 https://www.bloomberg.com/news/videos/2022-04-19/russia-s-may-9-victory-day-looms

Moscow Victory Day Parades
Events affected by the 2022 Russian invasion of Ukraine
2022 in military history
2022 in Moscow
May 2022 events in Russia
Moscow Victory Day Parade
Articles containing video clips
 
Neo-Sovietism
Nationalism in the Soviet Union
Nationalism in Russia
Propaganda in Russia
Anti-Ukrainian sentiment in Russia
Reactions to the 2022 Russian invasion of Ukraine
International reactions to armed conflicts
Sanctions and boycotts during the Russo-Ukrainian War